M. ursinus may refer to:
 Macaca ursinus, a macaque species in the genus Macaca
 Melursus ursinus, a bear species
 Microporus ursinus, a plant pathogen species

See also
 Ursinus (disambiguation)